Ramona Fuhrer-Weisskopf (born 13 April 1979) is a Swiss ice hockey player. She competed in the women's tournament at the 2006 Winter Olympics.

References

External links
 

1979 births
Living people
Swiss women's ice hockey forwards
Olympic ice hockey players of Switzerland
Ice hockey players at the 2006 Winter Olympics
People from Aarberg
Sportspeople from the canton of Bern